Club Deportivo Platense Municipal Zacatecoluca, usually abbreviated to just Platense, is a Salvadoran football club s based in Zacatecoluca, the departmental capital city of La Paz Province, they currently play in the Primera División. The club play their home games at the Estadio Panorámico de Zacatecoluca, which has a capacity of 10,000

History
The football club was founded on 1 May 1951. one of the key founder Napoleón Villalta stated one of the key reasons for starting the club was to give the reserves players of historic club 11 Viroleño an opportunity for game time.

Another founder Ramiro Díaz suggested the club name as a tribute to Argentinian club Club Atlético Platense.

At the beginning of the 1970s, the club was still an obscure football team playing in the regional amateur division. They steadily improved and by 1972 were playing in Tercera division.

Around this time, the Rengifo family took over the financial and administration side of the club gathering new sponsors and contributing large amount of their own family fortune. Their contributions generated almost immediate results: in 1973 the club under the direction of Brazilian Jorge Tupinambá dos Santos won the Tercera División for the first time and earned promotion to the Segunda División de Fútbol Salvadoreño.

Despite this success, The Rengifo family parted ways with Jorge Tupinambá dos Santos and hired Argentinian Juan Quarterone whose new tactics, player recruitment and training methods helped the team win the Segunda División de Fútbol Salvadoreño in 1974 and earn promotion to the Salvadoran Primera División for the first time in the club history.

Platense did the impossible and won the 1975 Primera division, they also set various records doing so such being the second team to win the title after gaining promotion in their very first season (Aguila in 1959 being the first), The club had won all three titles i three different division consecutively, The club also completed the double winning the primera and the Torneo Fraternidad / UNCAF Club Championship.

International success (1975)
Platense along with domestic success, became the first Salvadoran team to win the Torneo Fraternidad / UNCAF Club Championship in 1975 thanks to players such as Albert Fay, Jaime Castro, Helio Rodríguez, "Ninón" Osorio, Pedro Silva, Jorge "el Indio" Vásquez, José Luis Rugamas, David Pinho, Luis Condomi, Ricardo Zafanella, Jorge Búcaro and Rafael "Ráfaga" Búcaro.

Decline
After the highs of 1975, The club still remained a competitive force in 1976–1978, however the club fortune began to dwindle when the Regnifo family fled El Salvador due to the increasing conflict in the country. Soon the clubs could not retain their star players and were eventually relegated in 1980. As the civil war continued the club continued to flounder in the Segunda Division and eventually after 10 years he club was relegated to Tercera diving  during the early 1990–91 season.
It would take another 13 years before the club will be promoted back into second division thanks to future internationals Luis Anaya and former World cup player as coach Mauricio Alfaro.

Resurgence and Promotion
Following increased support by the community and stronger financial backing by local businesses, Platense began a resurgence in the second division. 
The club recruited first team coach Jorge Abrego and key players such as Herberth Ramos, Wilber Arizala.
Platense won their first second division in 45 years. Winning the Apertura 2019 title by defeating Racing Jr 4–3 on aggregate. They were on the verge of winning back to back titles, Sadly 2020 Clausura season was suspended due to the outbreak of coronavirus in El Salvador. It was then announced that despite winning the 2019 title that no promotion would occur.

Despite the disappointment of being denied promotion, the departures of key players such as the league and club top scorer Colombian Cristian Gil Hurtado, Keeper Herberth Ramos, and the sacking of Jorge Abrego as coach.
This would enable the club to win their second title in recent time by defeating AD Destroyer 4–3 on penalties after the game ended 2–2 in regular time.

After a season of consolidation, It appeared that Platense would win three straight titles in a row, they reached the final and were leading 3–0. However the club would let in 3 late goals  and would the game 5–4 on penalties.

On 20 June 2021, after 41 years out of the Primera Division, Platense were promoted back to the top flight following a 2-1 playoff victory against regular title contenders AD Destroyer 2–1 with goals coming from Steve Alfaro and Camilo Delgado.

Recent Events
Under Guillermo Rivera, Platense competed in the first season in the primera division in 41 years, Platense finished sixth. They defeated Luis Angel Firpo 4-3 aggregate in the quarter-final. In the semi-final, they defeated Chalatenango 2–1 on the aggregate to advance to the final of a major tournament for the first time since 1975—and the club's first Primera division final in the Apertura/Clausura format—where they lost out to Alianza 2–1 at Estadio Cuscatlan on 20 December 2021. Colombian striker Juan Camilio Delgado was Platense top scorer with twelve goals

Club

Stadium
 Estadio Antonio Toledo Valle, Zacatecoluca, La Paz Department (El Salvador) (1974-Present)
 Estadio Jiboa, San Vicente (2009)
 Polideportivo Tecoluca, San Vincente (2020-2021)
 Estadio Cuscatlan (2022-Current) games in the CONCACAF Champions League

Platense plays its home games at Estadio Antonio Toledo Valle in Zacatecoluca, La Paz. The stadium "Estadio Antonio Toledo Valle", which previously belonged to the National Institute of Sports (INDES), now are being cared for by the municipality.
During stadium renovations in 2020, they played their matches in the Polideportivo Tecoluca, San Vincente.

Rivalries
Platense Municipal Zacatecoluca's main rival was C.D. Tehuacan. They were rivals since the clubs were only separated by 11 km. The final result was a 3:0 victory to Platense Municipal Zacatecoluca. However, since Tehuacan was dissolved in 2009, Platense have no real rivals at present.

Sponsorship
Companies that Platense currently has sponsorship deals with include:
 Maca sport – Official Kit Suppliers	
 Electrolit – Official sponsors
 Pollo campestre – Official sponsors 
 Sudagripm – Official sponsors 
 Caja de credito zacatecoluca – Official sponsors 
 Renosa – Official sponsors
  Canal 4 – Official sponsors

Records
 Platense are only the third team to win the First Division in their very first season in the top flight in 1975 (Águila 1959 and Vista Hermosa 2005, are the other two)
 Platense are only one of two teams to win the Copa Interclubes UNCAF in 1975 (Alianza being the other in 1997)
 Platense were the first Salvadoran team to the win Copa Interclubes UNCAF in 1975
 Platense have won all three division titles Tercera Division (1973, 2003), Segunda Division (1974, Apertura 2019, Apertura 2020) and Primera División (1975)
 Platense is the first and so far only club to win a first division title while based in the La Paz Department (El Salvador)
 Record loss: 1-19 vs. Atlante, Cancha Jorgito Meléndez, 11 September 1968.
 Youngest player: Luis Guevara Mora (14 years and 2 months) v TBD 28 July 1975.

Top goalscorers 

Note: Players in bold text are still active with Platense

Goalscoring champions

Overall seasons table in Primera División de Fútbol Profesional
{|class="wikitable"
|-bgcolor="#efefef"
! Pos.
! Club
! Season In D1
! Pl.
! W
! D
! L
! GS
! GA
! Dif.
|-
|align=center bgcolor=|TBA
|C.D. Platense Municipal Zacatecoluca
|align=center |8
|align=center|225
|align=center|88
|align=center|45
|align=center|92
|align=center|307
|align=center|350
|align=center|-43
|}

Historical Matches

Honours
These awards are updated to May 2022.
Throughout its history, the club has managed several international, national and regional titles that have made it occupy the top position in the ranking of the La Paz football teams, being considered one of the most outstanding Salvadoran football clubs.

Domestic

Primera División: 1
 Champions: (1) : 1975
 Runners up: (1) : Apertura 2021
Segunda Division: 3
 Champions: (3) : 1974, Apertura 2019, Apertura 2020
 Play-off winners: 2020-21
Tercera Division: 2
 Champions: (2) : 1973, 2003

CONCACAF

Copa Fraternidad: 1
 Champions: (1) : 1975

Current squad
As of: February 3, 2023

In

Out

Personnel

Management
As of December 2022

Coaches
The club's current manager is Salvadoran Erick Prado. There have been TBD permanent and TBD caretaker managers of Platense since the appointment of the club's first professional manager, TBD in 1950. The club's longest-serving manager, in terms of both length of tenure and number of games overseen, is TBD, who managed the club between 1996 and 2018. Argentine TBD was Platense's first manager from outside the El Salvador. Agentinian Juan Quarterone is the club's most successful coach, having won their only Primera division title and international titles (1975 Primera division and 1975 Copa Fraternindad), this followed by Guillermo Rivera who won one Segunda division title and one runners up Primera division title, Jorge Abrego and Brazilian Jorge Tupinambá dos Santos win Segunda division title. Mauricio Alfaro won one Tercera division title.

Argentina:
 Gregorio Bundio (1970)
 Juan Quarterone (1974–1975)

Brazil:
 Jorge Tupinambá dos Santos (1972-1973)
 Mauro de Oliveira (Jan 2014 – Nov 2014)
  Eraldo Correia (Mar 2018– Apr 2018)

Guatemala:
 Jorge “Grillo” Roldán (1977) 

Uruguay:
  Víctor Pereira Viteca (1967-1968)
 Ruben Da Silva (December 2022 - Present)

El Salvador:
 Jorge Cabrera Rajo
 Maurisio Palma
 Rogelio Castro (1973)
 Jesús Landos (1978)
 Raúl Magaña (1976–)
 Salvador Mariona (1978)
 Francisco Zamora
 Raul "Cayito" Mejía Fuentes
 Mauricio Alfaro (1992–1993)
 Mauricio Alfaro (2003–2005)
 Luis Ángel León (2006)
 Oscar Emigdio Benítez (2007)
 Armando Contreras Palma (2008)
 Juan Ramón Sánchez (2008)
 Eduardo Lara Moscote (2010 – December 2013)
 Oscar Parra (November 2014 – February 2015)
 Nelson Ventura (February 2015 – May 2015)
 Eduardo Lara Moscote (June 2015 – February 2016)
 Miguel Aguilar Obando (February 2016 – September 2016)
 Ervin Loza  (Interim)  (September 2016 – October 2016)
 Salvador Velasquez Lovo (October 2016– February 2017)
 Jose Mario Martinez (February 2017 – April 2017)
 Juan Ramón Paredes (June 2017 – September 2017)
 Afrodicio Valladares (Interim)  (September 2017 – October 2017)
 Omar Pimentel (October 2017 – March 2018)
 Jorge Abrego (May 2018 – March 2020)
 Guillermo Rivera (March 2020 - April 2022)
 Ivan Ruiz (April 2022 - June 2022)
 Erick Prado (June 2022 - December 2022)

Notable former players
Players listed below have had junior and/or senior international caps for their respective countries before, while and/or after playing at Platense. 

 Mauricio Alfaro
 Luis Anaya
 Salvador Cabezas
 Rafael Burgos
  Albert Fay
 Roque Antonio 'Tony' Rojas
 Salvador Mariona
 Luis Guevara Mora
 José Luis Rugamas
 Martín Velasco 
 Norberto Zafanella
 Fábio Pereira de Azevedo
 Manuel Gonzalez
 Mauricio Esteban Mendez

Team captains

Sports statistics
 Updated to July 2021.

Sports general information

External links
 Platense trabaja a futuro – Diario CoLatino 
facebook
twitter
instagram
  – Cero A Cero

References

Association football clubs established in 1951
Football clubs in El Salvador
1951 establishments in El Salvador
P